The second series of Ex on the Beach Italy, an Italian television programme, began airing on 22 January 2020 on MTV Italy. The official list of cast members was confirmed with an image spread on networks, it includes three single boys and four single girls.

Cast 

 Bold indicates original cast member; all other cast were brought into the series as an ex.

Duration of cast 

 Table Key
 Key:  = "Cast member" is featured in this episode
 Key:  = "Cast member" arrives on the beach
 Key:  = "Cast member" has an ex arrive on the beach
 Key:  = "Cast member" arrives on the beach and has an ex arrive during the same episode
 Key:  = "Cast member" leaves the beach
 Key:  = "Cast member" has an ex arrive on the beach and leaves during the same episode
 Key:  = "Cast member" does not feature in this episode

After filming
Sasha Donatelli then returned in the third season in the role of ex.

Episodes

Notes

References

External links 

 Official website

2020 Italian television seasons
01